The S&P/ASX 50 Index is a stock market index of Australian stocks listed on the Australian Securities Exchange from Standard & Poor's.

It is a part of the S&P Global 1200.

While the "ASX 50" often simply refers to the 50 largest companies by market capitalisation, the S&P/ASX 50 Index is calculated by using the S&P Dow Jones Indices market capitalization weighted and float-adjusted methodologies. All 50 companies also feature in the S&P/ASX 200.

Constituent companies
, the constituent stocks of the ASX 50 in alphabetical order by symbol are:

See also

 List of Australian exchange-traded funds
 S&P/ASX 20
 S&P/ASX 200
 S&P/ASX 300
 All Ordinaries

References

External links
 

Australian Securities Exchange
Australian stock market indices
A050